Ram Krishna Yadav  is an Indian politician.  He was elected to the Lok Sabha,  the lower house of the Parliament of India from Azamgarh constituency in 1989 as member of the Bahujan Samaj Party.He was a student of the Banaras Hindu University and is a lawyer.

References

External links
 Official biographical sketch in Parliament of India website

1937 births
Living people
Bahujan Samaj Party politicians from Uttar Pradesh
Lok Sabha members from Uttar Pradesh
India MPs 1989–1991
People from Azamgarh district